Dactylolabis sexmaculata is a Palearctic species of cranefly in the family Limoniidae.It is found in  a wide range of habitats and micro habitats: in earth rich in humus, in swamps and marshes, in leaf litter and in wet spots in woods.

References 

Limoniidae
Taxa named by Pierre-Justin-Marie Macquart